Nel Centro was a restaurant in downtown Portland, Oregon. The restaurant opened in 2009 and closed in 2020, during the COVID-19 pandemic.

History

The restaurant opened in 2009. Baker Lee Posey left in 2009. John Eisenhart became executive chef in 2015. In 2020, chef and restaurateur David Machado closed Nel Centro and his four other Portland restaurants permanently, including Altabira City Tavern, during the COVID-19 pandemic.

See also

 COVID-19 pandemic in Portland, Oregon
 Impact of the COVID-19 pandemic on the restaurant industry in the United States
 List of defunct restaurants of the United States

References

External links
 

2020 disestablishments in Oregon
Defunct restaurants in Portland, Oregon
Restaurants disestablished during the COVID-19 pandemic
Restaurants disestablished in 2020
Restaurants established in 2009
Southwest Portland, Oregon